Daniel Walsh (born May 31, 1979, in Norwalk, Connecticut) is an American rower. He won a bronze medal in the men's eight at the 2008 Summer Olympics.

Walsh attended Brien McMahon High School in Norwalk.  Prior to 2008 he had served as an alternate for the men's eight in the 2004 Summer Olympics but did not have a chance to row during those games.

References

External links
 
 

1979 births
Living people
American male rowers
Rowers at the 2008 Summer Olympics
Olympic bronze medalists for the United States in rowing
Sportspeople from Norwalk, Connecticut
Medalists at the 2008 Summer Olympics
World Rowing Championships medalists for the United States